Samuel Cox (30 October 1920 – May 1985) is an English former professional footballer who played as a full back in the Football League.

References

Sources

1920 births
1985 deaths
People from Mexborough
Footballers from Doncaster
English footballers
West Bromwich Albion F.C. players
Accrington Stanley F.C. (1891) players
Scunthorpe United F.C. players
Denaby United F.C. players
English Football League players
Association football fullbacks